Cheam June Wei (born 23 January 1997) is a Malaysian badminton player. He was the mixed doubles gold medalist at the 2014 Summer Youth Olympics.

Career 
Cheam started playing badminton at aged 8 in Penang. As a junior player, he has been trained by Teh Peng Huat, the former coach of world No. 1 Lee Chong Wei, for more than year before training under task Lim Theam Teow. In 2012, he won the mixed team bronze medal at the Asia Junior Championships in Gimcheon, South Korea. In 2014, he was promoted to join the national team from the Bukit Jalil Sports School, and at the same year he competed at the Nanjing Summer Youth Olympics and clinched the mixed doubles title with his partner from Hong Kong, Ng Tsz Yau. He also the runner-up at the 2014 Malaysia International Junior Championships, and at the 2015 Dutch Junior, he was the champion.

Achievements

Youth Olympic Games 
Mixed doubles

BWF World Tour (2 runners-up) 
The BWF World Tour, which was announced on 19 March 2017 and implemented in 2018, is a series of elite badminton tournaments sanctioned by the Badminton World Federation (BWF). The BWF World Tours are divided into levels of World Tour Finals, Super 1000, Super 750, Super 500, Super 300, and the BWF Tour Super 100.

Men's singles

BWF International Challenge/Series (2 titles, 4 runners-up) 
Men's singles

  BWF International Challenge tournament
  BWF International Series tournament

References

External links 
 

1997 births
Living people
Sportspeople from Penang
Malaysian sportspeople of Chinese descent
Malaysian male badminton players
Badminton players at the 2014 Summer Youth Olympics
21st-century Malaysian people